Qala Piwrani (Aymara qala stone, piwra granary, -ni a suffix, "the one with a stone granary", also spelled Khala Piurani) is a  mountain in the Bolivian Andes. It is located in the La Paz Department, Inquisivi Province, Colquiri Municipality. Qala Pirwani lies northeast of Iru Pata and Jaqi Jiwata.

References 

Mountains of La Paz Department (Bolivia)